The Royal Montserrat Defence Force is the home defence unit of the British Overseas Territory of Montserrat. The force has an authorized strength level objective of 50 reserve personnel as of 2021-22, akin in size to that of a platoon-sized unit.

History
Raised in 1899, the unit is today a reduced force of about forty to fifty volunteer soldiers, primarily concerned with civil Defence and ceremonial duties. The unit has a historical association with the Irish Guards. The current Commanding Officer is Lieutenant-Colonel Alvin Ryan, who was first appointed the force commanding officer in 2014, and who assumed command from the late Captain Horatio Tuitt. The appointment of a unit commander at the Lieutentant-Colonel level in 2022 was a first-time event for the force. As a British Overseas Territory (BOT), defence of Montserrat remains the responsibility of the United Kingdom.

Uniform

Ranks
Ranks are as follows:(The RMDF use the Star of St Patrick as a 'pip' like Irish Guards)

See also
Royal Bermuda Regiment
Cayman Islands Regiment
Turks and Caicos Islands Regiment
Royal Gibraltar Regiment
Falkland Islands Defence Force
 British Army Training and Support Unit Belize
 Overseas military bases of the United Kingdom

References

Government of Montserrat
British colonial regiments
Military units and formations established in 1899
Regiments of the British Army
1899 establishments in Montserrat
Brades
Military units and formations of British Leeward Islands in World War II
Military of Montserrat